Rejas is an administrative neighborhood (barrio) of Madrid belonging to the district of San Blas-Canillejas.

Enlace externo

Wards of Madrid
San Blas-Canillejas